In algebraic topology, an area of mathematics, a homeotopy group of a topological space is a homotopy group of the group of self-homeomorphisms of that space.

Definition
The homotopy group functors  assign to each path-connected topological space  the group  of homotopy classes of continuous maps 

Another construction on a space  is the group of all self-homeomorphisms , denoted  If X is a locally compact, locally connected Hausdorff space then a fundamental result of R. Arens says that  will in fact be a topological group under the compact-open topology.

Example
According to the Dehn-Nielsen theorem, if  is a closed surface then  i.e., the zeroth homotopy group of the automorphisms of a space is the same as the outer automorphism group of its fundamental group.

References

Algebraic topology
Homeomorphisms